Shiwanzhen Subdistrict is a subdistrict of Chancheng District, located in the southwest of the city of Foshan, Guangdong province, People's Republic of China.

Ceramics

Shiwan has a long history of ceramic sculpture, with many vivid works by generations of craftsmen. Its 5000-year-long ceramic making history has accumulated the rich and abundant ceramic culture, and won the high prestige of the "Capital of Ceramics in South China".

External links 

Foshan
Township-level divisions of Guangdong
Subdistricts of the People's Republic of China